Li Baolian (born 8 March 1963) is a Chinese athlete. She competed in the women's javelin throw at the 1988 Summer Olympics.

References

1963 births
Living people
Athletes (track and field) at the 1988 Summer Olympics
Chinese female javelin throwers
Olympic athletes of China
Place of birth missing (living people)
Asian Games medalists in athletics (track and field)
Asian Games gold medalists for China
Medalists at the 1986 Asian Games
Athletes (track and field) at the 1986 Asian Games
20th-century Chinese women